Mizanur Rahman (born July 30, 1991, Rajshahi) is a first-class and List A cricketer from Bangladesh. He played for Duronto Rajshahi in the 2012 BPL tournament where he scored a half century on debut.

In December 2017, he and Nazmul Hossain Shanto batting for Rajshahi Division against Dhaka Metropolis in the 2017–18 National Cricket League, made the highest opening partnership in a domestic first-class match in Bangladesh, scoring 341 runs.

He was the leading run-scorer for Central Zone in the 2017–18 Bangladesh Cricket League, with 439 runs in six matches.

In October 2018, he was named in the squad for the Dhaka Dynamites team, following the draft for the 2018–19 Bangladesh Premier League. In December 2018, he was named in Bangladesh's team for the 2018 ACC Emerging Teams Asia Cup.

References

1991 births
Living people
Bangladeshi cricketers
Barisal Division cricketers
Rajshahi Royals cricketers
Khulna Tigers cricketers
Legends of Rupganj cricketers
Prime Doleshwar Sporting Club cricketers
Kala Bagan Cricket Academy cricketers
Abahani Limited cricketers
Bangladesh under-23 cricketers
People from Rajshahi District
Rupganj Tigers Cricket Club cricketers